State Trunk Highway 145 (STH-145, commonly known as Highway 145 or WIS 145) is a  state highway in Milwaukee, Waukesha, and Washington counties in Wisconsin, United States, that connects the northwest suburbs of Milwaukee with the city's downtown.  For much of its route, the highway is known as Fond du Lac Avenue.

Route description
Up until the fall of 2009, Highway 145's northern terminus was at the freeway interchange with US-41 in Richfield.  A project involving the construction of five roundabouts in a less than one mile span has truncated the highway's northern terminus to the freeway interchange with US-45, with the stretch of roundabouts between US-41 and US-45 now designated as County Highway FD.  Highway 145 travels generally southeast through Germantown as a secondary highway.  Upon reaching Menomonee Falls, the road expands into a four-lane boulevard for just over one mile (1.6 km), straddling the Waukesha and Milwaukee County line before intersecting with US-41/45 again.

At this point, the road heads into the city limits of Milwaukee and becomes a freeway, officially known as the Fond du Lac Freeway, though this term is rarely used locally.  Although it was originally planned to continue into the heart of downtown, the freeway ends after just under five miles (8 km) at which point it intersects with 68th Street and Hampton Avenue.  Highway 145 continues as Fond du Lac Avenue into downtown.  It is a four-lane boulevard until Burleigh Street, at which point it becomes a four-lane urban arterial.  It becomes a four-lane boulevard again at 20th Street until its intersection with Sixth Street.  A major interchange at I-43 is just past the intersection with Walnut Street.  Highway 145 turns south onto Sixth Street before terminating at the intersection with US-18 (Wells Street), adjacent to the Wisconsin Center.

Highway 145 was once also a part of the Park East Freeway, a short spur running east from its intersection with I-43, over the Milwaukee River before terminating at Broadway and Milwaukee Street at East Knapp Street.  The freeway was demolished between 2002 and 2003, with the replacement surface streets not complete until 2006.

Major intersections

Fond du Lac Freeway extension
Originally, the freeway portion of Highway 145 was to extend further southeast and there was to be a major interchange located near the intersection of W Lisbon Road and W North Avenue, connecting the Fond du Lac with the proposed extension of the Stadium Freeway and the proposed Bay Freeway.  This was never built.

In October 1975, Milwaukee County Executive John Doyne proposed connecting this freeway with the Stadium North stub end, existing  to the south.  While this "Gap Closure" has not been built to date due to public opposition, the current state trunk highway map shows a freeway planned for this corridor.

See also

References

External links

 WIS 145 Terminus Photos
 Wisconsin Highways:  Milwaukee Freeways:  Fond du Lac Freeway, Christopher Besser

145
Freeways in the Milwaukee area
Transportation in Milwaukee County, Wisconsin
Transportation in Waukesha County, Wisconsin
Transportation in Washington County, Wisconsin